Bacchisa transversefasciata is a species of beetle in the family Cerambycidae. It was described by Breuning in 1960. It is known from the Philippines.

References

T
Beetles described in 1960